Fairfield is a census-designated place (CDP) in the town of Fairfield in Somerset County, Maine, United States. The population was 2,569 at the 2000 census.

Geography
Fairfield is located at  (44.588701, −69.599716).

According to the United States Census Bureau, the CDP has a total area of 1.8 square miles (4.8 km2), all land. Fairfield is drained by the Kennebec River.

Demographics

As of the census of 2000, there were 2,569 people, 1,102 households, and 689 families residing in the CDP. The racial makeup of the CDP was 97.63% White, 0.23% Black or African American, 0.23% Native American, 0.51% Asian, 0.04% from other races, and 1.36% from two or more races. Hispanic or Latino of any race were 0.19% of the population.

There were 1,102 households, out of which 31.9% had children under the age of 18 living with them, 43.1% were married couples living together, 13.8% had a female householder with no husband present, and 37.4% were non-families. 30.2% of all households were made up of individuals, and 12.5% had someone living alone who was 65 years of age or older. The average household size was 2.33 and the average family size was 2.90.

In the CDP, the population was spread out, with 25.8% under the age of 18, 7.6% from 18 to 24, 28.9% from 25 to 44, 22.4% from 45 to 64, and 15.3% who were 65 years of age or older. The median age was 37 years. For every 100 females, there were 87.1 males. For every 100 females age 18 and over, there were 85.0 males.

The median income for a household in the CDP was $31,303, and the median income for a family was $41,458. Males had a median income of $30,018 versus $25,395 for females. The per capita income for the CDP was $15,070. About 4.2% of families and 10.6% of the population were below the poverty line, including 9.4% of those under age 18 and 17.1% of those age 65 or over.

References

External links
 Town of Fairfield, Maine
 Fairfield Historical Society 
 Lawrence Public Library

Census-designated places in Maine
Census-designated places in Somerset County, Maine